BYO Split Series Volume II is the second album in the BYO Split Series, featuring Swingin' Utters and Youth Brigade.

Track listing

References

External links
BYO Split Series Volume II on BYO Records

BYO Split Series
1999 albums
Swingin' Utters albums
Youth Brigade (band) albums